The following is a list of results for the Jamaica national rugby league team since their first match in 2009 against the United States. Matches marked with a † are not included in the results table as they were not sanctioned by the International Rugby League. The matches were either not played by two IRL-recognised national teams, or were played with modified rules (often an extended bench and unlimited interchanges).

All-time record

Matches

2000s

2010s

2020s

References

External links 

Rugby league-related lists